Mirecki is the surname of:
 Aleksander Mirecki, Polish violinist
 Franciszek Mirecki, Polish composer, music conductor, and music teacher
 José Luis de Mirecki Ruiz-Casaux, Spanish economist
 Lee Mirecki, United States Navy Airman Recruit killed during a military training exercise
 Maurice de Mirecki, French pianist, violinist and composer
 Víctor Mirecki Larramat, Spanish cellist and music teacher of Franco-Polish origin

Surnames

pl:Mirecki
ru:Мирецкий
uk:Мірецький